Song Lian (1310–1381), courtesy name Jinglian, was a Chinese historian and politician of the Ming dynasty. He was a literary and political advisor to the Hongwu Emperor. Before that, he was one of the principal figures in the Yuan dynasty's Jinhua school of Neo-Confucianism. As a head of the official Bureau of History of the Ming dynasty, Song Lian directed the compilation of the official dynastic history of the preceding Yuan dynasty.

The compilation of the History of Yuan, commissioned by the court of the Ming dynasty, was completed in 1370. Under the guidance of Song Lian, the official dynastic history broke with the old Confucian historiographical tradition, and established a new historical paradigm professing that the influence of history was equal in influence to the great Confucian classics in directing the human affairs.

In Asian historiography, the History of Yuan is a major source for the study of the histories of the Han, Tungusic, Mongol, and Turkic peoples.

See also 
 Twenty-Four Histories

References 

 Kelly Boyd, "Encyclopedia of Historians and Historical Writing", Taylor & Francis, 1999, .

1310 births
1381 deaths
14th-century Chinese historians
Historians from Zhejiang
Ming dynasty historians
Ming dynasty politicians
Politicians from Jinhua
Writers from Jinhua